Futebol Clube do Porto is a Portuguese sports club based in Porto that is best known for its professional football team playing in the country's top-tier division, the Primeira Liga. Porto played their first match a few days after the club's foundation in 1893, but only began playing competitively in 1911, when they took part and won the first José Monteiro da Costa Cup. Since then, the team has entered and often achieved success in several domestic and international football competitions. This list includes all the players that have made at least 100 competitive appearances for the first team, either as a member of the starting eleven or as a substitute.

João Pinto, former right-back and captain, holds Porto's record for most appearances, having played 587 matches during an uninterrupted senior career of 16 years at the club. He is one of only two players with over 500 first-team appearances; the other is former goalkeeper and also captain Vítor Baía, who appeared in 566 matches in 17 seasons. Four other players have made at least 400 appearances; among them is Aloísio, a former Brazilian centre-back who holds the team record for most appearances by a foreign player. Fernando Gomes is Porto's top goalscorer, with 347 goals in 455 appearances. The only other club player with more than 300 goals is Pinga, who scored 314 times in 15 consecutive seasons.

Table key

The list is ordered first by year of first appearance, then by total number of appearances.
Players active in the first team have their name shown in italics, and can add to their totals.
Appearances and goals are counted only for first-team competitive matches in the Primeira Liga, Taça de Portugal (including the predecessor Campeonato de Portugal), Taça da Liga, Supertaça Cândido de Oliveira, European Cup/UEFA Champions League, UEFA Cup/UEFA Europa League, UEFA Super Cup, and defunct competitions such as Campeonato do Porto, Cup Winners' Cup, Inter-Cities Fairs Cup, and Intercontinental Cup.
Position – Playing position: GK = goalkeeper, DF = defender, MF = midfielder, FW = forward
Club career – First and last calendar years in which the player appeared for the club in any of the competitions listed above.
Appearances – Number of matches played with the club (as starter and substitute)
Goals – Number of goals scored with the club
National team – Country represented by the player at international level during his career with the club.
Caps – Number of international appearances made by a player during his career with the club (n/a = information not available).
 – Player is a club record holder.

Players with 100 or more appearances

Footnotes

References

Bibliography

Citations

Players
 
FC Porto
Association football player non-biographical articles